Servan-Schreiber is a surname. Notable people with the surname include:

Brigitte Gros, born Brigitte Servan-Schreiber (1925-1985), French journalist and politician
Christiane Collange, born Christiane Servan-Schreiber (born 1930), French journalist
David Servan-Schreiber (1961-2011), French physician
Émile Servan-Schreiber (1888-1967), French journalist
Fabienne Servan-Schreiber, French film and television producer
Jean-Claude Servan-Schreiber (1918–2018), French journalist and politician
Jean-Jacques Servan-Schreiber (1924-2006), French journalist and politician
Jean-Louis Servan-Schreiber, French journalist

See also
Servan (disambiguation)
Schreiber (surname)

Compound surnames
French-language surnames
Jewish surnames